This is a list of prizes, medals and awards including cups, trophies, bowls, badges, state decorations etc., awarded in Sri Lanka.

National honours, Military and Police medals
Sri Lankan honours system
Awards and decorations of the military of Sri Lanka
Awards and decorations of the Sri Lanka Police

Science, mathematics, technology
National Awards for Science and Technology - National Science Foundation and the Ministry of Science and Technology
National Science Foundation Research Awards - National Science Foundation

Computer science, engineering, information technology
National Best Quality Software Awards - British Computer Society Sri Lanka section (BCSSL)
National Engineering Awards - Institution of Engineers of Sri Lanka (IESL)
IT Security Awards - ISACA Sri Lanka Chapter
e-Swabhimani Award - Information and Communication Technology Agency of Sri Lanka (ICTA)National recognition of local content. www.eswabhimani.lk

Arts and entertainment

Art

Beauty
 Miss Universe Sri Lanka

 Miss World Sri Lanka

 Miss Earth Sri Lanka

 Miss Sri Lanka Online

Film
 SIGNIS Awards

 Derana Film Awards\

 Sarasaviya Awards

Journalism
 Sri Lanka journalism awards for excellence

Literature
 State Literary Awards 

 Gratiaen Prize

Music

Radio

Television
 Sumathi Awards

 Raigam Tele'es

Architecture and construction
Geoffrey Bawa Award - Geoffrey Bawa Trust

Business and management
National Business Excellence Awards - National Chamber of Commerce of Sri Lanka
National Productivity Award - National Productivity Secretariat
SLIM Brand Excellence Awards - Sri Lanka Institute of Marketing
Effie Award - Sri Lanka Institute of Marketing
Sri Lanka National Quality Award - National Science Foundation
Achiever of Industrial Excellence Award - Ceylon National Chamber of Industries

Travel and tourism
Presidential Awards for Travel and Tourism

Education

Humanitarianism

Inventions
Presidential Awards for Inventions - Presidential Secretariat

Politics

Sports and Games

Sri Lankan Schoolboy Cricketer of the Year

 
Sri Lanka
prizes